Jan Kowalski (born 15 February 1937) is a retired Polish football midfielder and later manager.

References

1937 births
Living people
Sportspeople from Zabrze
Polish footballers
Poland international footballers
Association football midfielders
Górnik Zabrze players
Ekstraklasa players
I liga players
Polish football managers
Górnik Zabrze managers